Lankan Cricket Club is a first-class cricket team in Sri Lanka.

History
Lankan Cricket Club played in the Premier Trophy from 2005–06 to 2012–13. It was one of six clubs that lost their places when the competition was reduced from 20 teams to 14 for the 2013–14 season. It also lost its List A status at the same time. The club played at lower levels until the 2019–20 season when it was promoted back to the 'A' division of the Premier Trophy. 

In its eight seasons of first-class cricket, Lankan Cricket Club played 74 matches, with 11 wins, 28 losses and 35 draws. It played 59 matches of List A cricket, with 28 wins, 28 losses, one tie and two matches that did not reach a result.

Current squad 
These players featured in matches for Lankan CC in the 2019/20 season.

Players with international caps are listed in bold.

Records
The highest first-class score was 175 by Ashen Silva against Nondescripts Cricket Club in 2011–12. The best innings bowling figures were 8 for 58 by Ranil Dhammika against Panadura Sports Club in 2007–08. Gayan Sirisoma took seven wickets in an innings five times; in 27 matches for Lankan Cricket Club, he took 148 wickets at an average of 16.95.

Clubs with similar names
There is a Lankans Cricket Club in Toronto, and in England there are several clubs with similar names: Leicester Lankans Cricket Club and Midland Lankans Cricket Club, for example. There are also several instances around the world of a Sri Lankans Cricket Club and a Sri Lankan Cricket Club.

References

External links
 Lankan Cricket Club at CricketArchive
 Lankan Cricket Club at Cricinfo

Sri Lankan first-class cricket teams